We Are the Void is the ninth full-length studio album by the Swedish melodic death metal band Dark Tranquillity. It is their first and only album with bassist Daniel Antonsson, who joined in 2008 and left in 2013.

The band began writing for this album in late 2008 (except for the majority of "Iridium" which was written sometime between 1996-1998 but was left out until this album). Stylistically, it is similar to their previous album Fiction; the band utilised the same Drop B tuning as well as clean melodic vocals that were re-introduced on Fiction.

The band also began to release songs from this album on their MySpace page starting with "Dream Oblivion" on 21 December 2009, "At the Point of Ignition" on 14 January 2010 and finally the entire album was available for free streaming on 19 February 2010.

Music videos were released for "Shadow in Our Blood" on 10 February 2010 and "In My Absence" on 22 February 2012.

Reception

Kyle Ward of Sputnikmusic, described the album:

"If you take Fiction, cut out the awesome guitar riffs, increase the keyboard presence tenfold, and then make it more depressed-sounding, you will have exactly what We Are The Void delivers."

Metal Underground said that the album is "Excellent melodic death metal, but it feels like Dark Tranquillity has released the same album three times in a row now."

Track listing

Inside The Void DVD

Personnel

Dark Tranquillity
Mikael Stanne – vocals, lyrics
Martin Henriksson – rhythm guitar, sound recording
Niklas Sundin – lead guitar, album artwork
Anders Jivarp – drums
Martin Brändström – keyboards, engineering
Daniel Antonsson – bass guitar, lead guitar solo (on "Shadow in Our Blood" (1st part) and "At the Point of Ignition"), engineering

Guests
Tue Madsen – mixing (October–November 2009) & mastering (Antfarm Studio in Århus)
Anders Björler - filmed "Studio Report 2009"
Hasse Kosonen - engineering
Daniel Antonsson - engineering
Stefan Wibbeke - artwork
Katja Kuhl - band photo

References

2010 albums
Century Media Records albums
Dark Tranquillity albums